Collège Saint-Alexandre is a private secondary school (high school) located in Gatineau, in the Outaouais region, in the province of Quebec, Canada. It is located on Rue Saint-Louis in the Gatineau sector in the Limbour neighbourhood.

Once exclusive for boys, it became an inclusive (boys and girls) institution in 1990. Known for its solid reputation of superior education, ranking in the top 15 of all high schools in Québec, it attracts students from all over the region, particularly from the towns of Ottawa, Hull, Gatineau, Cantley, Chelsea, Aylmer, Buckingham and Masson-Angers.

History 
The building in which the school is housed was built in 1850 by Alonzo Wright. It was at first used as a manor for parties. Wright died in 1894. After the death of his wife in 1904, the property was bought by Jesuit priests fleeing secularization in France. They sought to turn the building into a private institution where they would teach classical studies, including philosophy, Greek, and Latin.

In 1912, it would become the Collège Saint-Alexandre, which was founded by the Congregation of the Holy Spirit. In 1967, the classical courses were abolished after extensive reforms by the Quebec government during the Quiet Revolution, in which the province acquired a large role in the jurisdiction of education. Priests have gradually stopped teaching, and today the institution is as secular as public schools. In 1988–89, the first female students were admitted to the College; the first group finished the secondary level in 1993.

In 2004, students, who already had a strict clothing policy, started wearing a uniform.

Motto 
The school's motto is Vitam Impedere Vero, which comes from the Latin poet Juvenal. It means, "To devote one's life to the truth."

References

Books 
Gay, Paul Cahiers Lestage: Breve Histoire du College Saint-Alexandre (Gatineau, Collège Saint-Alexandre) Call Number  365.L.01.7 
Gobeil, Maurice Cahiers Lestage: Le 'Roi de la Gatineau' et le college Saint-Alexandre (Gatineau, Collège Saint-Alexandre) Call Number  365.L.01.4 
Larose, Marie-Anne Cahiers Lestage: Les Soeurs des Sacres-Coeurs Au College Saint-Alexandre (Gatineau, Collège Saint-Alexandre) Call Number  365.L.01.12

External links 
  

High schools in Gatineau
Private schools in Quebec
Heritage sites in Quebec (Cultural Heritage Act)
Heritage sites in Outaouais
Educational institutions established in 1912
1912 establishments in Quebec